Isao Ono may refer to:

 Isao Ono (biathlete) (born 1942), Japanese Olympic biathlete
 Isao Ono (ice hockey) (born 1933), Japanese Olympic ice hockey player